Of Seismic Consequence is the fifth full-length studio album by Chicago-based progressive metal band Yakuza. It was released on June 22, 2010 by Profound Lore Records.

Track listing
"The Ant People" - 3:48
"Thinning the Herd" - 3:37
"Stones and Bones" - 5:40
"Be That As It May" - 8:10
"Farewell to the Flesh" - 11:12
"Testing the Waters" - 6:27
"Good Riddance (Knuckle Walkers)" - 2:59
"The Great War" - 2:44
"Deluge" - 7:18

Personnel
 Bruce Lamont - saxophone, vocals
 James Staffel - drums
 Matt McClelland - guitar, vocals
 Ivan Cruz - bass guitar

References

2010 albums
Yakuza (band) albums
Profound Lore Records albums